Peer Mohamed Oliyullah Dargha is named after the Sufi philosopher, and Tamil poet Peer Mohamed Appa, born in Tenkasi of Tirunelveli District and having spent formative years of meditation in the Peermedu of Kerala State, came to Thuckalay and chose to stay permanently. It is now one of the most renowned Sufi pilgrim centers in Kanyakumari, the southernmost district of Tamil Nadu.

He was renowned as a poet and philosopher, writing in Tamil. He had a very close relationship with the rulers of the Chera dynasty in Travancore. 

The Anniversary of this Sufi philosopher and poet is celebrated every year in the Arabic month of Rajab This event is being conducted by Thuckalai APMA Jamaath; People from various parts of Kerala and Tamil Nadu visit the Dargha irrespective of their religion during this month. The festival day is declared as a local holiday by the state government for the whole district of Kanyakumari.

The vow of sleeping in the Dargah premises is considered sacred. The annual festival is celebrated during the month of Rajab and this festival devotees all over Tamil Nadu and Kerala take part in this event.

References

 Buildings and structures in Kanyakumari district
 Dargahs in Tamil Nadu